Shengao is a town in Jiangyan District, Taizhou, south-central Jiangsu province, China.  It is called the hometown of fish and rice because of the high quality of the fish and rice production in the town.  It is among the first of the opening cities designated by the State Council of China.

Location
Shengao town is located just north of the core of Jiangyan District. The Nanjing-Qidong railway and Yangzhou Canal pass through the town from east to west.  The Nanjing-Yancheng highway and Jiangyan-Qingtong river also go through the town from south-to-north, providing a very good transportation network.

Economy
Shengao is famous for its 'green agriculture' and scenery.  Organic food, such as vegetables, fish, shrimps, and crabs are the main output in its agriculture sector.  Some of the well-known brands are 'Heheng' rice=, 'Santai' pickles, and 'Ruchun' preserved duck eggs.  There are 10 categories of food qualified to use the national 'Green Food' symbol, and most of these are products of Jiangsu province.

Industry in Shengao is developing.

In June 1995, when Jiang Chunyun, vice-chairman of the Standing Committee of the Ninth National People's Congress (NPC) visited Shengao, he pointed out Shengao is an example of modern agriculture, and the experience of developing of agriculture is very convincing and has a say in the national wide.
Shengao has a total GDP 38.1 million and a tax income 1.8 million yuan.  This year, Shengao was named a good example of Dainan and Zhangguo style towns by the Secretary General and mayor of Taizhou.

Awards
In 1990, Heheng village in Jiangyan city was awarded Global 500 Roll of Honor by the United Nations Environment Programme (UNEP) because of its success in protecting the environment while increasing the grain yield and its wide use of marsh biogas ponds.

Villages
 Shengao
 Dantang
 Lianmeng
 Wanzhong	  
 Guanzhuang
 Jiahe
 Shuangxing
 Xiazhu
 Heheng
 Fengzhuang
 Tianmin
 Houbao
 Huayang
 Xiabei: Seat of Townhall.
 Zhaoxing
Postal Code: 225538

Companies
 Jiangyan Hengyuan Clothing Corp
 Jiangyan Huanqiu Auto Corp
 Jiangsu Kangjian Medical Instrument Ltd (江苏康健医疗用品有限公司, 超幸村, +86-523-8651752)
 Jiangyan Xinkang Medical Instrument Ltd
 江苏百灵农化有限公司
 江苏动物药品厂有限公司
 江苏新华袜厂
 泰州市华隆针织有限公司
 江苏金刚针织有限公司
 姜堰市新型纺织有限公司
 Jiangsu Santai Pickle and Researve Food Ltd (江苏三泰酱菜有限公司, 沈高村, +86-523-8651010)
 姜堰市鑫生园食品有限公司
 姜堰市明珠米厂
 姜堰市明牛乳业有限公司
 泰州正荣特种禽业发展有限公司
 泰州市河横家禽育种有限公司

Schools
 Shengao Middle School
 Shengao Career Training High School

External links
The Official Town Government Website of Shengao, Jiangyan, Jiangsu
Jiangyan Investment Service Bureau, Jiangsu

Taizhou, Jiangsu
Township-level divisions of Jiangsu